Gijs Lamoree (3 October 1903 – 13 October 1966) was a Dutch athlete. He competed in the men's long jump and the men's triple jump at the 1928 Summer Olympics.

References

External links
 

1903 births
1966 deaths
Athletes (track and field) at the 1928 Summer Olympics
Dutch male long jumpers
Dutch male triple jumpers
Olympic athletes of the Netherlands
People from Schoonhoven
Sportspeople from South Holland
20th-century Dutch people